The Tonga Cup is Tonga's men's football domestic cup held annually. The current titleholders are Ngeleʻia FC.

Previous winners
They are:  
1981:    Ngele'ia FC 
1982:    Ngele'ia FC 
1983:    Ngele'ia FC 
1984:    Veitongo FC
1985:    Ngele'ia FC 
1986:    Ngele'ia FC 
1987:    Ngele'ia FC 
1988:    Ngele'ia FC 
1989-1993: not held 
1994:    Navutoka FC
1995-1997: not held
1998:    Veitongo FC
1999-2001: not held
2002:    Ngele'ia FC 
2003:    Ngele'ia FC
2004-2008: not held
2009-2010: not know
2011: Marist FC
2012-2019: not know
2020:    Veitongo FC

References

Football competitions in Tonga
National association football cups